Rubén Gómez may refer to:

Rubén Gómez (baseball) (1927–2004), Puerto Rican baseball player
Rubén Gómez (footballer)
Rubén Gómez (singer) (born 1974), American singer; sang with Menudo
Rubén Gómez (cyclist), Colombian Olympic cyclist